

1930s

K.D. Mehra made the first Punjabi "talkie" film, Sheela, also known as Pind Di Kurhi, in 1935. Young Noor Jehan was introduced as an actress and singer in this film. Sheila was made in the city of Calcutta (now Kolkata) and released in Lahore. It ran very successfully and was a hit across the province. Due to the success of this film more producers started making Punjabi films.

Notable Punjabi film of the 1930s:
 Pind Di Kurhi (1930) – the first Punjabi film with synchronized sound

1940s–1970s

1980s
Notable Punjabi films of the 1980s:

1990s
Notable Punjabi films of the 1990s:

2000s

2010s

2020s

References